MGSM is an abbreviation which can refer to:

Macquarie Graduate School of Management
Military General Service Medal, a UK military service medal